2-Cyclopentenone is a ketone with chemical formula  and CAS number 930-30-3. It is structurally similar to cyclopentanone, with the additional feature of α-β unsaturation in the ring system. 2-Cyclopentenone contains two functional groups, a ketone and an alkene. It is a colorless liquid.

The term cyclopentenone may also refer to a structural motif wherein the cyclopentenone moiety is a subunit of a larger molecule.  Cyclopentenones are found in a large number of natural products, including jasmone, the aflatoxins, and several prostaglandins.

Synthesis
2-Cyclopentenones can be synthesized in a number of ways. One of the routes involves elimination of α-bromo-cyclopentanone using lithium carbonate and Claisen condensation-decarboxylation-isomerization cascades of unsaturated diesters as shown below.

The acid-catalyzed dehydration of cyclopentanediols affords cyclopentenone.

As a functional group, the synthesis of 2-cyclopentenones is accomplished in a variety of other ways, including the Nazarov cyclization reaction from divinyl ketones, Saegusa–Ito oxidation from cyclopentanones, ring-closing metathesis from the corresponding dienes, oxidation of the corresponding cyclic allylic alcohols, and the Pauson–Khand reaction from alkenes, alkynes, and carbon monoxide.

Reactions
As an enone, 2-cyclopentenone undergoes the typical reactions of α-β unsaturated ketones, including nucleophilic conjugate addition, the Baylis–Hillman reaction, and the Michael reaction. Cyclopentenone also functions as an excellent dienophile in the Diels–Alder reaction, reacting with a wide variety of dienes. In one example, a Danishefsky-type diene is reacted with a cyclopentenone to yield a fused tricyclic system en route to the synthesis of coriolin.

Occurrence
It has been isolated from pressure-cooked pork liver by simultaneous steam distillation and continuous solvent extraction.

References

Enones
Cyclopentenes